is a railway station on the Nagasaki Main Line in Saga, Saga Prefecture, Japan, operated by Kyushu Railway Company (JR Kyushu). It is a seasonal station and is only operational during the Saga International Balloon Fiesta (held around the end of October/beginning of November).

Layout

The station consists of two outward-facing side platforms serving two tracks. The two platforms are linked by walkways.

Adjacent stations

History
The station opened on 18 November 1989. Permanent platform structures were built in 2002.

Surrounding area
The station lies east of the Kase River and mainly surrounded by fields, with few homes or businesses in the area. The Saga International Balloon Fiesta brings many tourists to the area. National Route 34 (Saga Bypass) lies 1 km to the north.

See also
 List of railway stations in Japan

References

External links

 Goo Transit information 

Stations of Kyushu Railway Company
Nagasaki Main Line
Railway stations in Saga Prefecture
Railway stations in Japan opened in 1989